Dreamscape may refer to:
 A compound word made up of the stems dream and landscape meaning a dream world

Music 
 Dreamscape (band), a German progressive metal band
 Dreamscape, a 1995 album by Jamaaladeen Tacuma
 Dreamscape, a 2009 album by Gil Mantera's Party Dream
 Dreamscape, a 2006 song on Alexander Perls's album 009 Sound System
 Dreamscape, a song on In Flames's 1994 album Lunar Strain
 Dreamscape, a song on Alan Parsons's 1993 album Try Anything Once
 Dreamscape, a series of 'rave' events held in the United Kingdom during the 1990s by ESP Promotions, beginning at the Sanctuary Music Arena in Milton Keynes
 Dreamscape, a song on Epica 2014 album The Quantum Enigma
 Dreamscape, a song on Toyah Willcox's 1983 album Love Is the Law (Toyah album)
 Dreamscapes, a 1999 box set by Alphaville
 "Dreamscapes", a song on the 3rd and the Mortal's 1996 album Painting on Glass

Film and television 
 Dreamscape (1984 film), a 1984 science fiction film
 Dreamscape (2007 film)
 "Dreamscape" (Xiaolin Showdown), a 2004 episode of Xiaolin Showdown
 "Dreamscape" (American Dragon: Jake Long), a 2006 episode of American Dragon: Jake Long
 "The Dreamscape", a 2008 first-season episode of Fringe

Other uses 
Dreamscape, a 2007 play by Rickerby Hinds about the police shooting of Tyisha Miller in Riverside CA
 Dreamscape Online, an ISP based in upstate New York
Dreamscape, a 2011 video game developed by Speedbump Studies for iOS devices
Dreamscape (chat), a 2D chat environment
A plugin for Autodesk 3ds Max
Dreamscape Immersive, a virtual reality company 
Dreamscape Media, an American audiobook and video publishing company owned by Midwest Tape
Dreamscape Entertainment, a subsidiary and production studio owned by ABS-CBN Corporation